Mesod Benady MBE (born 17 July 1930) is a Gibraltarian historian of Sephardic Jewish descent. He currently lives in Grendon, Northamptonshire in the United Kingdom.

Benady was involved in local politics during the seventies; he contested the 1976 election, as an independent, and in the 1980 election, as a candidate of the Party for the Autonomy of Gibraltar, led by Joseph Triay; he defended positions of rapprochement with Spain. In neither election was he successful.

Benady has specialised in the local and military history of Gibraltar and has also written about:
Sephardic Jews in general;
The Jewish communities in Gibraltar,
Malta
Menorca; and
The Royal Navy.

In 2000 he was appointed MBE after a proposal by the Government of Gibraltar for his services to local history. In 1993 he founded a history journal published by the Gibraltar Heritage Trust. He is a Fellow of the Royal Historical Society, was one of the board members of the Friends of Gibraltar Heritage Society 1985–2013. Benady was elected "Consejero de Honor" of the Centro de Estudios Campogibraltareños and runs the publishing house Gibraltar Books Ltd., specialising in books about Gibraltar.

Works
The Settlement of Jews in Gibraltar, 1704 -1783, Transactions, Jewish Historical Society of England 26 (1979)
The Gibraltar police, 1830–1980 (Mediterranean Sun, 1980)
The Jewish Community of Gibraltar, in Western Sephardim (Gibraltar Books, 1989)
Guide to the Gibraltar Museum,  (Ashford, Buchan & Enright, 1989)
The Royal Navy at Gibraltar,  (Maritime Press, Liskeard, 1992)
Los menorquines en Gibraltar in Revista de Menorca (1992)
Grendon in Northamptonshire, with Eileen Wilmin,  (Gibraltar Books, 1994)
The Streets of Gibraltar,  (Gibraltar Books, 1996)
The Convent at Gibraltar in Journal of the Society of Army Historical Research 77 (Summer 1999)
Spaniards in Gibraltar in Gibtel Gibraltar Heritage Journal No 7,  (2000)
The Settee Cut: Mediterranean Passes issued at Gibraltar in The Mariner's Mirror 87:3 (August 2001)
Genoese in Gibraltar in Gibtel Gibraltar Heritage Journal No 8,  (2001)
The Royal Navy at Gibraltar Since 1900,  (Maritime Books, 2004)
The Royal Gibraltar Police, with Cecilia Baldachino (Gibraltar Books, 2005)
Trade and Contraband in Gibraltar in Eighteenth and Nineteenth Centuries’, Anglo-Saxons in the Mediterranean (Malta University Press 2007)
"Essays on the History of Gibraltar" (Gibraltar Books 2014)

References

External links
Short biography of Tito Benady as speaker in the session Gibraltar Privateers 1793 to 1814, in the 5th International Congress of Maritime History 23 June 2008 – 27 June 2008

Living people
1930 births
Gibraltarian historians
Gibraltarian Sephardi Jews
Jewish historians
Members of the Order of the British Empire
Gibraltarian emigrants to England
People from North Northamptonshire
British Sephardi Jews
Fellows of the Royal Historical Society